This is a list of the judges of the Supreme Court of Ghana. The Constitution of Ghana provides for the court to be made up of the Chief Justice of Ghana and not less than nine other Justices of the Supreme Court. It shall be duly constituted by at least five Supreme Court judges.

Appointment of judges
Article 144 clause 1 of the 1992 Constitution of Ghana stipulates that the Chief Justice of Ghana is to be appointed by the President of Ghana acting in consultation with the Council of State and with the approval of the Parliament of Ghana. Article 144 clause 2 states that Justices of the Supreme court are appointed on the advice of the Judicial Council in consultation with the Council of State and with the approval of Parliament. Where the position of Chief Justice is vacant or where the holder of the position is unable to perform their duties for a period, the most senior member of the Supreme Court shall act as Chief Justice as in clause 6 of Article 144. In May 2020, President Akufo-Addo appointed four additional judges to the Supreme Court.

Retirement or removal from office
According to Article 145 clause 4 of the constitution, a Supreme Court Judge is expected to vacate their office on reaching the age of seventy years. They can carry on up to an additional six months to ensure that they are able to complete any proceedings they may have been involved in at that stage. The judges are guaranteed job security. Article 146 states the conditions for their removal as "except for stated misbehaviour or incompetence or on ground of inability to perform the functions of his office arising from infirmity of body or mind." The procedure for this has also been clearly stated in the constitution.

List of judges of the Supreme Court

See also
 Constitution of Ghana
 Judiciary of Ghana
 Supreme Court of Ghana

References

External links
Justices of the Supreme Court (Judicial Service of Ghana)

Judiciary of Ghana
Justices of the Supreme Court of Ghana
Ghana